Muhammad Daming Sunusi (born in Bulukumba, South Sulawesi, Indonesia, June 1, 1952) is a judge from Indonesia who became famous for his words "rape victims and perpetrators alike enjoy" in the House of Representatives of Indonesia at the fit and proper test as a potential justice of the Supreme Court of Indonesia.

References

External links
 Palembang High Court

1952 births
Living people
21st-century Indonesian judges
People from Bulukumba Regency
20th-century Indonesian judges